The 1912–13 Sheffield Shield season was the 21st season of the Sheffield Shield, the domestic first-class cricket competition of Australia. South Australia won the championship.

Table

Statistics

Most Runs
Ernie Mayne 476

Most Wickets
Bill Whitty 25

References

Sheffield Shield
Sheffield Shield
Sheffield Shield seasons